Tom Dixon was an all-star and award winning kicker in the Canadian Football League.

A graduate of UBC, Dixon played 4 seasons in the CFL. During his first two, with the Edmonton Eskimos, he was named an all-star and won the Dave Dryburgh Memorial Trophy in 1986 for points scored. He finished his career the Ottawa Rough Riders, having score 510 points.

References

1960 births
Living people
Edmonton Elks players
Ottawa Rough Riders players
Players of Canadian football from British Columbia
Canadian football people from Vancouver
UBC Thunderbirds football players
University of British Columbia alumni